Sonny Dee Bar (1965–1994) was a Quarter Horse stallion and famous sire of show horses, not only Quarter Horses but Paint Horses and Appaloosas as well.

Life

Sonny Dee Bar was a registered Quarter Horse who was foaled in 1965. His sire was Win Or Lose, a descendant of Three Bars (TB) and Leo. His dam was linebred to Midnight Jr, as both her sire and her dam were by Midnight Jr. He died on August 20, 1994.

Show career 
Sonny Dee Bar earned a Superior Halter Horse award from the American Quarter Horse Association (or AQHA), along with a Performance Register of Merit.

Breeding record 
Sonny Dee Bar sired, among others, such famous horses as Red Sonny Dee, Lucky Machine, Sonny Go Lucky, Sonny Deluxe, Dirty Larry, Sonny Go Royal, James Caan, and Scotch Bar Time. He sired 1070 Quarter Horse foals in his breeding career, with thirty-one of them AQHA Champions, one AQHA Supreme Champion, and five AQHA World Champions.

Honors 
Scotch Bar Time was inducted into the National Snaffle Bit Association Hall of Fame in 2002. Sonny Dee Bar was inducted into the AQHA Hall of Fame in 2003.

Pedigree

Notes

References

 All Breed Pedigree Database Pedigree of Sonny Dee Bar retrieved on June 27, 2007
  AQHA Hall of Fame accessed on September 2, 2017
 
 National Snaffle Bit Association Hall of Fame retrieved July 5, 2007

External links
 Sonny Dee Bar at Quarter Horse Directory
 Sonny Dee Bar at Quarter Horse Legends

American Quarter Horse show horses
American Quarter Horse sires
1965 animal births
1994 animal deaths
AQHA Hall of Fame (horses)